Red Sonja is a fictional sword and sorcery comic-book superheroine created by writer Roy Thomas and artist Barry Windsor-Smith for Marvel Comics in 1973, partially inspired by Robert E. Howard's character Red Sonya of Rogatino.

Marvel Comics published stories featuring Red Sonja until 1986, and returned to the character for a one-shot story in 1995. In 2005, Dynamite Entertainment began publishing stories of the heroine, during which the original Sonja was killed and replaced by a "reincarnation". The series was rebooted by writer Gail Simone in 2013, telling an altered version of Red Sonja's early life story via flashbacks. Subsequent writers of Red Sonja have included Amy Chu, Mark Russell, Luke Lieberman, Jimmy Palmiotti, and Amanda Conner, among others.

Red Sonja has appeared in numerous titles, both as a solo protagonist and together with Conan, as well as in crossovers with characters from Marvel Comics and Dynamite Comics. A total of six Red Sonja novels were published from 1981 to 1983 all written by David C. Smith and Richard L. Tierney and, in 1985, a feature film starring Brigitte Nielsen in the title role, Red Sonja, was released.

Sonja's signature clothing is her bikini armor, consisting typically of scale mail. In 2011, Red Sonja was ranked 1st in Comics Buyer's Guide's "100 Sexiest Women in Comics" list.

History

Marvel Comics (1973–1995)
Red Sonja was created by writer Roy Thomas and artist Barry Windsor-Smith for Marvel Comics in 1973, partially based on Robert E. Howard's character Red Sonya of Rogatino, a female swashbuckler from his 1934 short story "The Shadow of the Vulture".

Red Sonja debuted in Marvel's Conan the Barbarian #23 (1973). Thomas created a new origin story and transposed the timeline from the 16th century of Howard's original Red Sonya to the Hyborian Age, another Howard creation, in order to have the comic-book Red Sonja interact with Conan the Barbarian. In 1975, Marvel Comics published the first issue of Red Sonja after the character headlined Marvel Feature for seven issues that same year.
Red Sonja's origin story was told in the story "The Day of the Sword", in Kull and the Barbarians #3 (1975), written by Roy Thomas and Doug Moench and illustrated by Howard Chaykin. The same story was later redrawn by Dick Giordano and Terry Austin in The Savage Sword of Conan #78 (July 1982).

In this version, Red Sonja lives with her family in a humble house in the Western Hyrkanian steppes. When she is 21, a group of mercenaries kills her family and burns down their house. Sonja attempts to defend herself, but cannot lift her brother's sword. She is raped by the leader of the group. Answering her cry for revenge, the red goddess Scáthach appears to her and gives her incredible fighting skills, on the condition that she never lie with a man unless he defeats her in fair combat.

Marvel's last published story featuring Red Sonja was the one-shot issue Red Sonja: Scavenger Hunt #1 (December 1995), written by Glenn Herdling and illustrated by Ken Lashley.

Dynamite Comics (2005–present)
In 2005 Dynamite Comics began publishing Red Sonja. The first series, which ran for 80 issues, continued the Marvel Comics' continuity of the character, picking up from where Marvel left off with the character in 1986. Dynamite's first series depicts the original Sonja's death in issue #34. A new character of the same name, described as a reincarnation, takes her place from issue #35 onward. A soft reboot begins in issue #50 using the same continuity as Marvel Comics.

At the 2013 Emerald City Comic Con, Dynamite Entertainment, which began publishing Red Sonja comics in 2005, announced that Gail Simone would be writing a new ongoing Red Sonja series with art from Walter Geovani. Simone noted in interviews that her version was slightly "rebooted", showing the character's beginnings. Issue #1 of Simone's run was released in July 2013 to positive reviews. The series lasted 18 issues. After Simone's run, Dynamite launched a new Red Sonja series in January 2016. The book featured Marguerite Bennett as writer, and a redesign of the main character by artist Nicola Scott. That series lasted six issues.

In 2017, a new Red Sonja comic series debuted by Amy Chu with art by Carlos Gomez. The series ran for 25 issues, ending in 2019.

In November 2019, a new series by writer Mark Russell and art by Mirko Colak debuted to positive critical reception, leading into a spinoff series called Killing Red Sonja. Russell left the series after issue 24 and was replaced with writer Luke Lieberman, with art by Drew Moss. The series ran 28 issues.

In mid-2021, Dynamite released the anthology Red Sonja: Black, White, Red. Each issue presents stories by different teams of artists and writers, including Kurt Busiek, Benjamin Dewey, Amanda Deibert, Cat Staggs, Mark Russell, and Bob Q. Also announced was a crossover with Project superpower. A sequel to it will be released in November 2022 called Vampirella VS Red Sonja.

In February 2021, Dynamite released a series titled Sonjaversal depicting Red Sonja meeting various different versions of herself across the multiverse. That same month, Amanda Conner and Jimmy Palmiotti co-wrote the series Invincible Red Sonja with artist Moritat.

In June 2021, the character appeared in Die!namite and Die!namite Lives. That same month, Dynamite Entertainment announced that a new series written by Mirka Andolfo and drawn by Giuseppe Cafaro would debut in September 2021. The first issue sold out its initial run of 32,000 copies, prompting a second printing.

In December 2021, it was announced that Red Sonja would appear in the sequel to Die!namite and Die!namite Lives called Die!namite Never Dies. 

Hell Sonja, a spinoff from Sonjaversal, was released in January 2022. That same month, the Immortal Red Sonja series by writer Dan Abnett and artist Alessandro Miracolo was announced for April, which would depict Sonja in King Arthur's Camelot. In February 2022, Dynamite announced that it would debut Red Sitha in May, set ten years after Andolfo's storyline, following Red Sonja's adopted daughter, Sitha.

In March 2022, Dynamite announced another spinoff titled from Sonjaversal, Samurai Sonja, written by Jordan Clark with art by Pasquale Qualano. May 2022 a one-shot fairy tale reimagining Red Sonja as Jack from Jack and the giant beanstalk would be released in August 2022

In July 2022, it was reported that Dynamite would debut its new Red Sonja flagship title, Unbreakable Red Sonja, in time for the character's 50th anniversary in 2023. A Hell Sonja/Red Sonja crossover was announced in September 2022.

Depiction of sexuality

Bikini armor 

Most artists depict Red Sonja wearing a very brief "chainmail bikini" costume of scale armor, usually with boots and gauntlets. As originally drawn by Barry Windsor-Smith for "The Shadow of the Vulture" and "The Song of Red Sonja" in Conan the Barbarian issues 23 and 24 (1972), she wore a long-sleeved mail shirt and short pants of red silk. 

As told by Roy Thomas in the introduction of Red Sonja Adventures Volume 1 (Dynamite Entertainment) Spanish artist Esteban Maroto submitted an uncommissioned illustration to him when he was editing the magazine Savage Sword of Conan where he redesigned the character and for the first time showed her wearing what would become her famous costume, the silver "metal bikini", which resembled other fantasy costumes that other Maroto heroines sported in the 1970s. This illustration had been printed for the first time in Jim Steranko's magazine Comixscene #5 in black and white. It was reprinted in Savage Sword of Conan #1, and in Marvel Treasury Edition #15 colored but poorly reproduced, and finally restored and colored by José Villarrubia as an alternative cover for the Dynamite Entertainment edition of Red Sonja #2. Maroto drew her in this costume for a double page spread illustration in Savage Tales #3 and then for her first solo adventure in Savage Sword of Conan #1, and John Buscema drew her in this costume in the same magazine. Buscema drew her again in this costume in issues 43, 44 and 48 of  Conan the Barbarian (1974) and Dick Giordano in the first issue of Marvel Feature vol. 2 (Nov. 1975) before Frank Thorne took over from issue #2 (Jan. 1976).

Bisexuality 
In 2016, author Gail Simone indicated that Sonja was bisexual during her run. In 2020, the series Red Sonja: The Price of Blood by writer Luke Lieberman and artist Walter Geovani corroborated this, depicting Sonja as having slept with a woman.

Comics bibliography

As a main character

Spinoff bibliography

In solo stories in anthologies

Team-ups
 With Spider-Man in Marvel Team-Up #79 (Marvel Comics) writer: Chris Claremont; artist: John Byrne 
 With Spider-Man in Spider-Man/Red Sonja mini-series co-published by Dynamite Entertainment. The Spider-Man/Red Sonja TPB collects Spider-Man/Red Sonja (2007) #1 – 5 (Oct. 2007 – Feb. 2008) and Marvel Team-Up (1972 – 1985 1st Series) #79 (March 1979).
 Wolverine in What if? Vol. 2, #16 (Marvel Comics) (Sonja is defeated by Wolverine and becomes his mate).
 Official Handbook of the Conan Universe #1 (Marvel Comics) (1986).
 Marvel Feature #4 was reprinted in the book The Superhero Women edited by Stan Lee. Red Sonja was featured among many of Marvel's female characters on the cover painted by John Romita, Sr.

Team-ups with Conan

In other media

Novels 
Sonja has been featured in several novels by David C. Smith and Richard L. Tierney with covers by Boris Vallejo:
 #1 The Ring of Ikribu (Ace 1981) (Adapted to comics by Roy Thomas and Esteban Maroto in The Savage Sword of Conan issues 230–3). Smith has written an unproduced screenplay based on this novel.
 #2 Demon Night (Ace 1982)
 #3 When Hell Laughs (Ace 1982)
 #4 Endithor's Daughter (Ace 1982)
 #5 Against the Prince of Hell (Ace 1983)
 #6 Star of Doom (Ace 1983)

Television 
Angelica Bridges portrayed the character in the "Red Sonja" episode of the 1997–1998 TV series Conan the Adventurer. In 1999, there was a planned TV series with Sable starring as Red Sonja.

Film adaptations 
The character was played by Brigitte Nielsen in the 1985 film Red Sonja, which also starred Arnold Schwarzenegger as High Lord Kalidor (originally intended to be Conan). The film was directed by Richard Fleischer.

Misty Lee provided the character's voice in the 2016 animated film Red Sonja: Queen of Plagues.

Actress Rose McGowan was originally intended to portray Sonja in 2010's Red Sonja film, but these plans were abandoned after McGowan suffered injuries that permanently damaged the mobility and strength of her right arm. In a February 2011 interview, film producer Avi Lerner stated that Simon West was hired to direct the film and also mentioned Amber Heard as the frontrunner to star in the lead role. On February 26, 2015, Christopher Cosmos was hired to write the film's script. Filmmaker Mike Le Han has made a video for his pitch of him directing Red Sonja.

In 2017, Millennium Films announced a new Red Sonja movie, with Avi Lerner and Joe Gatta producing along with Cinelou Films' Mark Canton and Courtney Solomon and writing by Ashley Miller. In October 2018, Bryan Singer was confirmed to direct the film. In February 2019, following allegations against Singer of sexual assault, Millennium stated Red Sonja was no longer on their slate of films, and Singer was fired from the production the next month. On June 21, 2019, three months after Singer was removed as director, The Hollywood Reporter reported that Joey Soloway had been hired to write and direct the film. On February 26, 2021, the same publication announced that Tasha Huo was selected to write the film. On May 5, 2021, the same publication announced that Hannah John-Kamen was cast as the titular character. On June 3, 2021, The Illuminerdi reported that Sacha Baron Cohen was cast as Kulan Gath, a character from the Conan the Barbarian Marvel comics and in the Red Sonja Dynamite comics. The movie was scheduled to begin filming in 2022, but in March of that year it was reported that John-Kamen and Soloway had exited the project and M.J. Bassett was hired as director. On August 23, 2022, Millennium Media confirmed that the film had begun production in Bulgaria, with Italian actress Matilda Lutz playing the title role.

Role-playing games
Red Sonja is featured in the Dungeons & Dragons module Red Sonja Unconquered.

In 2018, Dynamite Entertainment released the Red Sonja: Hyrkania's Legacy board game, followed by an expansion module in 2020. The games allowed players to play as Red Sonja and various supporting characters in adventures set in Hyrkania.

Awards 
1973 Academy of Comic Book Arts Awards: Best Individual Story (Dramatic). The Song of Red Sonja. Written by Roy Thomas and pencilled, inked and colored by Barry Smith. The story first appeared in Conan the Barbarian issue 24 (March 1972), in which two panels were censored by John Romita, Sr. The uncensored story was reprinted in Marvel Treasury Edition, Volume 1, No. 15, 1977, where it was recolored by Glynis Wein and the artwork was slightly cropped to fit the page format.

Legal issues
On June 6, 2006, the comic news site Newsarama reported that Red Sonja, LLC (which holds rights to the Roy Thomas version of the character, created in 1973) filed a lawsuit on four counts against Paradox Entertainment (which claims rights to Red Sonya as part of the Howard library) in US Federal Court in April 2006. The four counts were claims of copyright infringement, trademark infringement, trademark dilution, and unfair competition. The lawsuit was settled in January 2008, on the second day of the hearing, for a sum of $1 each. Red Sonja LLC paid $1 to Paradox for the rights to Howard's Red Sonya and permission for the Red Sonja stories to continue being set in Conan's Hyborian Age. Paradox simultaneously paid $1 to Red Sonja LLC for the exclusive print-publication rights for "The Shadow of the Vulture" now that one of the characters belongs to Red Sonja LLC.

References

External links 

 
 A bibliography of Marvel Feature Presents and all the solo Red Sonja series published by Marvel Comics
 Red Sonja at Don Markstein's Toonopedia. Archived from the original on January 9, 2017.
 

 
Comics about women
Conan the Barbarian characters
Dynamite Entertainment characters
Dynamite Entertainment titles
Marvel Comics martial artists
Characters created by Roy Thomas
Characters in fantasy literature
American comics adapted into films
Comics characters introduced in 1973
Fantasy books by series
Fantasy comics
Fantasy film characters
Fictional bisexual females
Fictional mercenaries in comics
Fictional women soldiers and warriors
Fictional swordfighters in comics
Female characters in literature
Characters created by Barry Windsor-Smith
Fictional gladiators
Marvel Comics LGBT superheroes
Marvel Comics female superheroes
Fictional queens